The Ceiswyn Formation (also known as the Ceiswyn Beds) is an Ordovician lithostratigraphic group (a sequence of rock strata) in Mid Wales. The rock of the formation is made up of interleaved beds of silty mudstones and siltstones with some sandstones and tuffs also present in small amounts. The formation runs diagonally across Mid Wales from close by Bala Lake to Cardigan Bay near Tywyn.

Outcrops 
The formation is exposed in a number of locations in Mid Wales where glacial valleys cut across it. It is especially visible in the cliffs of Graig Goch.

Fossil content 
Harnagian-Soudleyan trilobites have been found in the rocks of the Ceiswyn Formation near Dinas Mawddwy.

References 

Geologic formations of Wales
Ordovician System of Europe
Hirnantian
Mudstone formations
Siltstone formations
Paleontology in Wales